The Itaya River is a tributary of the Amazon River via the Nanay River in northern Peru. The Itaya flows alongside the city of Iquitos and the district of Belén.

In Iquitos, a riverwalk and breakwater called Malecón Tarapacá overlooks the Itaya. To the north of Malecón Tarapacá is Malecón Maldonado.

The Itaya River is the namesake of the fan palm genus Itaya, which was first discovered on the river's bank.

The 2012 floods of the Amazon, Itaya, and Nanay Rivers left approximately 80,000 people homeless. In April 2015, 11 hours of steady rain swelled the Itaya again, causing the Iquitos–Nauta highway to collapse at four points: kilometres 22, 22.2, 23, and 26.

See also
 Marañón River

References

External links
 
 

Tributaries of the Amazon River
Rivers of Peru
Rivers of Loreto Region